Kovitkadavai is a Pillaiyar temple, which is located in Thunnalai, Jaffna, Sri Lanka.

Hindu temples in Jaffna District
Pillaiyar temples in Sri Lanka